Mimomorpha is a genus of longhorn beetles of the subfamily Lamiinae, containing the following species:

 Mimomorpha clytiformis Newman, 1842
 Mimomorpha flavopunctata Breuning, 1980

References

Desmiphorini